La Capricieuse was a ship of the French  minesweeping sloops (Avisos dragueur de mines). She was built by Chantiers Dubigeon at Nantes and launched on 19 April 1939.

After the Fall of France she was at Portsmouth and on 3 July 1940 she was seized by the Royal Navy. She served in the Royal Navy as HMS La Capricieuse until June 1945 when she was restored to the French Navy. She continued in service after the war and was scrapped in September 1964.

Notes

Sources

1939 ships
Ships built in France
World War II minesweepers of France
World War II minesweepers of the United Kingdom
Cold War minesweepers of France
Elan-class minesweeping sloops
Maritime incidents in July 1940
Ships built by Chantiers Dubigeon